Stenidea troberti is a species of beetle in the family Cerambycidae. It was described by Mulsant in 1843. It is known from France, Bosnia and Herzegovina, Greece, Crete, Spain, Corsica, Croatia, Morocco, Libya, Malta, Algeria, Sardinia, Italy, Sicily, and Tunisia. It feeds on Nerium oleander.

Subspecies
 Stenidea troberti cruciata (Sama, 1996)
 Stenidea troberti troberti Mulsant, 1843

References

troberti
Beetles described in 1843